Berachampa Deulia, or commonly known as Berachampa, is a census town in the Deganga CD block in the Barasat Sadar subdivision in the Deganga CD block of the North 24 Parganas district in the Indian state of West Bengal. The ancient archaeological site of Chandraketugarh, circa 300 BC, is located near Berachampa. Deulia and Deganga are located nearby. Berachampa is the business center of the area and the most important junction between Barasat and Basirhat. The area is administered by Berachampa Gram Panchayat no. II. The wider Berachampa circle consists of two gram panchayats namely Berachampa Gram Panchayat No. I and Berachampa Gram Panchayat No. II.

Etymology
The name derives from বেড়া (In English: Fence) and চাঁপা (In English: The flower Plumeria). There are multiple explanations on the etymology of this name. But the most accepted one is about Pir Gorachand of Haroa and a conflict with King Chandraketu.

Little is known about the early life of the princes Akananda and Bakananda. Satish Chandra Mitra however identified Akananda with his apparently uncorrupted name viz. Akshayananda. Akananda and Bakananda were the sons of Mahidananda, the ruler of Hatiagarh. According to Dr. Girindranath Das, Akananda and Bakananda were two generals based at Hatiagarh, under the command of king Chandraketu. According to Binay Ghosh, Akananda and Bakananda were either Poundra Kshatriyas or Byagra Kshatriyas by caste.

History
The Vidyadhari River, which flows through the area, has been part of local life since time immemorial. The river was a major navigation route for early civilisations. In the 3rd century BC, the nearby river port of Chandraketugarh was on the banks of this river. There are still signs of that era, and efforts are on near Berachampa to find more evidence of a lost civilization, possibly Mauryan. The source of the river is near Haringhata in Nadia. Later it meets the Raimangal at the confluence of Sundarbans.

Near Berachampa, there is the archeological site of Chandraketugarh, thought to be a part of the ancient kingdom Gangaridai that was first described by Ptolemy. The history of Chandraketugarh dates back to almost the 3rd century BC, during the pre-Mauryan era. Artefacts suggest that the site was continuously inhabited and flourished through the Shunga-Kushana period, onwards through the Gupta period and finally into the Pala-Sena period. Archaeological studies suggest that Chandraketugarh was an important town and a port city. It had a high encircling wall complete with a rampart and moat. The residents were involved in various crafts and mercantile activities. Although the religious inclinations of the people are unclear, hints of the beginning of some future cults can be seen in the artefacts. Some of the potteries carry inscriptions in Kharoshthi and Brahmi scripts.

After these periods, there was no such example of any other civilization on the ruin of Chandraketugarh. Anyway, the history of Berachampa was same as the History of Bengal. The Deva dynasty, Ilyas Shahi dynasty, Ganesha dynasty and Hussain Shahi dynasty ruled this region finally before Mughal period started.
After these periods, there was no such example of any other civilization on the ruin of Chandraketugarh. Anyway, the history of Berachampa was same as the History of Bengal. The Deva dynasty, Ilyas Shahi dynasty, Ganesha dynasty and Hussain Shahi dynasty ruled this region finally before Mughal period started.

After the Battle of Plassey, the region came under British control and was a part of British India Bengal Presidency until India got its independence in 1947. The area was heavily used in the initial days of British occupancy for Indigo farming as the area is known to be full of highly fertile farming lands.

This region witnessed migrations of Hindus and Muslims due to 1947 partition struggle and during 1971 Bangladesh Liberation War.

Geography

Location
Berachampa is located at 22°43'N 88°29'E. Berachampa is located in the Ganges Brahmaputra delta region in the district of North 24 Parganas, West Bengal state in eastern India. The village is roughly half-way between the towns of Barasat and Basirhat, approximately 34 kilometres (21 miles) from Kolkata. The area is very close to the Bangladesh border.

Climate
The climate is tropical, like the rest of West Bengal. A notable weather feature is the Monsoon season, which runs from early June to mid-September. The weather remains dry during the winter (mid-November to mid-February) and humid during summer. Relative humidity fluctuates between an average of 50% in March up to 96% in July.

Area overview
The area covered in the map alongside is largely a part of the north Bidyadhari Plain. located in the lower Ganges Delta. The country is flat. It is a little raised above flood level and the highest ground borders the river channels. 54.67% of the people of the densely populated area lives in the urban areas and 45.33% lives in the rural  areas.

Note: The map alongside presents some of the notable locations in the subdivision. All places marked in the map are linked in the larger full screen map.

Demographics

According to the 2011 Census of India, Berachanpa Deulia had a total population of 9,663, of which 4,938 (51%) were males and 4,725 (49%) were females. From religious aspect, 73.5% of the population are Hindus, 25.8% are Muslims and rest of 0.7% consists of Christians, Shikhs, Buddhists, Jains and Atheists. From language standpoint, 87.9% speaks Bengali, 8.3% speaks Hindi, 2.5% speaks Urdu and rest of 0.9% speaks Oriya, Telugu, Santhali, Nepali and Punjabi. Sex ratio for Berachampa is 957 (per 1000 of males there are 957 females) what is higher than North 24 pargana's average of 955. Population in the age range 0–6 years was 895. The literacy rate is 84.83% (76.86% North 24 Pgs average) with a gap of 7.86% towards female literacy. The total working population is 34.96%. Out of that, 22.86% are cultivators, 37.44% are agricultural labors, 4.03% are household industry workers and 35.67% are either owns a business or employed by businesses or offices.

Economy
Cotton weaving is the major industry in Berachampa; it is also an important trade center for goods such as rice, legumes, jute, sugar cane, potatoes, edible oil and coconuts. Many small industries can be found in and around the town, especially metalworking factories and embroidery workshops. Retail is a major source of income for the town, with the main market located on Taki Road.

Farming is a vital occupation in Berachampa. The presence of many leading banks (State Bank of India, United Bank of India, Allahabad Bank, Axis Bank, etc.) and Life Insurance Corporation of India (LICI) offices also provide employment. Deganga BDO office, other administrative offices, schools and colleges are also providing employments to the local residents.

Education

Schools

Berachampa Deulia Uchcha Vidyalaya
Binapani Balika Vidyalaya
Chowrashi High School
Hadipur Adorsho Vidyalaya
Deganga Karthikpur Adorsho Vidyapith
Eajpur High Madrasah
Rahmat-e-Alam Mission

Colleges

Chandraketugarh Sahidullah Smriti Mahavidyalaya was established at Berachampa in 1997. Affiliated with the West Bengal State University, it offers honors courses in Bengali, English, Sanskrit, Arabic, history, philosophy, education, political science, sociology and agriculture & rural development, and general courses in arts and science. The college has developed a "Chandraketugarh Museum".
Acharya Jagadish Chandra Bose Polytechnic was approved in 1963. It offers diploma courses in civil, mechanical, electrical and electronics & telecommunication engineering.
Rahmat-E-Alam Mission, a modern Educational Institute.

Healthcare
Berachampa is one of the areas where ground water is affected by arsenic contamination.

The North 24 Parganas District Hospital is located in Barasat. Berachampa also has several privately operated nursing homes and hospitals, such as the United Nursing Home, Janoseva Nursing Home, Sundarban Nursing Home etc. The Block Primary Health Care facility is in Biswanathpur and Chakla, Kolsur and Hadipur Jhikra have primary health care facilities with only outdoor services.

There is an Appollo Pharmacy and a lot of local medicine shops in Berachampa to get medicines. Pathology centers, private doctor's chambers are also there for non-emergency treatments. Most of online medicine providers serves the area for home delivery of medicines as well.

See also
 Barasat (Lok Sabha constituency)

References

External links

Villages in North 24 Parganas district